Ousseynou Boye (born 7 September 1992) is a Senegalese footballer who plays as a forward for Olympique Khouribga.

Career
He moved from native Diambars to Norwegian club Mjøndalen in the summer of 2015, and played three matches in the 2015 Eliteserien, then several matches in the 1. divisjon after relegation.

References

1992 births
Living people
Senegalese footballers
Association football forwards
Diambars FC players
Mjøndalen IF players
El Gouna FC players
Olympique Club de Khouribga players
Eliteserien players
Norwegian First Division players
Egyptian Premier League players
Botola players
Senegalese expatriate footballers
Expatriate footballers in Norway
Senegalese expatriate sportspeople in Norway
Expatriate footballers in Egypt
Senegalese expatriate sportspeople in Egypt
Expatriate footballers in Morocco
Senegalese expatriate sportspeople in Morocco